Rock pigeon may refer to:
 Rock dove (Columba livia), a Eurasian species introduced worldwide
 Petrophassa, an Australian genus of terrestrial pigeons
 Speckled pigeon (Columba guinea), an African species

Animal common name disambiguation pages